Stuart Hill may refer to:

Stuart Hill (author), English author of The Icemark Chronicles series of books
Stuart Hill (sailor), English amateur sailor, jurist and activist in the Shetland Islands independence movement
Stuart Hill (animator), the co-creator of Cartoon Network's Sunday Pants.